Traian Lalescu (12 July 1882 – 15 June 1929) was a Romanian mathematician. His main focus was on integral equations and he contributed to work in the areas of functional equations, trigonometric series, mathematical physics, geometry, mechanics, algebra, and the history of mathematics.

Life
He went to the Carol I High School in Craiova, continuing high school in Roman, and graduating from the Boarding High School in Iași. After entering the University of Iași, he completed his undergraduate studies in 1903 at the University of Bucharest.

He earned his Ph.D. in Mathematics from the University of Paris in 1908. His dissertation, Sur les équations de Volterra,  was written under the direction of Émile Picard. In 1911, he published Introduction to the Theory of Integral Equations, the first book ever on the subject of integral equations.

After returning to Romania in 1909, he first taught Mathematics at the Ion Maiorescu Gymnasium in Giurgiu. From 1909 to 1910, he was a teaching assistant at the School of Bridges and Highways, in the department of graphic statistics.

He was a professor at the University of Bucharest, the Polytechnic University of Timișoara (where he was the first rector, in 1920), and the Polytechnic University of Bucharest.

The Lalescu sequence

Legacy 
There are several institutions bearing his name, including Colegiul Naţional de Informatică Traian Lalescu in Hunedoara and Liceul Teoretic Traian Lalescu in Reşiţa.  There is also a Traian Lalescu Street in Timişoara. 
The National Mathematics Contest Traian Lalescu for undergraduate students is also named after him.

A statue of Lalescu, carved in 1930 by Cornel Medrea, is situated in front of the Faculty of Mechanical Engineering, in Timişoara and another statue of Lalescu is situated inside the University of Bucharest.

Work
 T. Lalesco, Introduction à la théorie des équations intégrales. Avec une préface de É. Picard, Paris: A. Hermann et Fils, 1912. VII + 152 pp. JFM entry
 Traian Lalescu, Introducere la teoria ecuaţiilor integrale, Editura Academiei Republicii Populare Romîne, 1956. 134 pp.  (A reprint of the first edition [Bucharest, 1911], with a bibliography taken from the French translation [Paris, 1912]).

References

External links

 "Representative Figures of the Romanian Science and Technology"
  "Traian Lalescu", from Colegiul Naţional de Informatică Traian Lalescu, Hunedoara
  "Cine a fost Traian Lalescu?", from Liceul Teoretic Traian Lalescu, Reşiţa
   "Monumentul lui Traian Lalescu (1930)", at infotim.ro
 A Class of Applications of AM-GM Inequality (From a 2004 Putnam Competition Problem to Lalescu’s Sequence) by Wladimir G. Boskoff and Bogdan Suceava, Australian Math. Society Gazette, 33 (2006), No.1, 51-56.

20th-century Romanian mathematicians
Mathematical analysts
Members of the Romanian Academy elected posthumously
Scientists from Bucharest
Romanian schoolteachers
Romanian textbook writers
Rectors of Politehnica University of Timișoara
University and college founders
University of Bucharest alumni
Academic staff of the University of Bucharest
Alexandru Ioan Cuza University alumni
University of Paris alumni
Academic staff of the Politehnica University of Bucharest
Carol I National College alumni
1882 births
1929 deaths